Corps General Mauro Del Vecchio OMRI (born 7 June 1946) is a former Italian Army general and politician. He commanded the NATO International Security Assistance Force (ISAF) in Afghanistan from August 2005 to May 2006 and was succeeded by British general David Richards.

Life and career 
Del Vecchio was born in Rome, Italy, and graduated from the Military Academy of Modena in 1967. He attended the specialization school of Turin. He subsequently earned the rank of tenente was given command of a platoon of Bersaglieri. He eventually became commander of a company of 8th Bersaglieri Regiment.

After that he attended the Scuola di Guerra (School of Warfare) and he was the commander of 1st Battalion of Bersaglieri. Then he was named commander of Florence military district. After his promotion to the rank of Generale di Brigata he led the infantry brigade Garibaldi. In the late 1990s, Del Vecchio was commander of the NATO Multinational Brigade North in Bosnia and Herzegovina (March–October 1997) and NATO Kosovo Force commander of the Multinational Brigade West in Kosovo. From September 2007 to March 2008, he was the commаnder of Joint Operations Command that oversaw the deployment of Italian forces around the world.

In the early months of 2008, he resigned from his position as commander of Comando operativo Interforze as he was running in the 2008 general election for the Democratic Party. He was elected to the Italian senate until 2013.

External links
 Nato biography 
 paginedidifesa.it, the news of his candidature for PD
 official page on Italian senate website

 

1946 births
Living people
Politicians from Rome
Italian generals
Members of the Senate of the Republic (Italy)
NATO-led peacekeeping in the former Yugoslavia
NATO personnel
20th-century Italian military personnel
21st-century Italian military personnel